SK Aarhus was a Danish women's handball club based in Aarhus. They played in Damehåndboldligaen when the team closed after the 2016-17 season because of financial issues. Aarhus United took over their licence for the league. SK Aarhus has previously also included basketball and volleyball.

History
SK Aarhus had consistently been at the bottom of Damehåndboldligaen and were relegated to 1. division after the 2004-05 season. They were, however, promoted again after just one season. Later, the club strengthened their roster with the likes of Karin Mortensen and Trine Troelsen and this resulted in a playoff place and fourth place after three matches against FCK Håndbold in the 2008-09 season.

On 30 November 2009, it was revealed that SK Aarhus had gone into receivership and that they had a deadline of 15 January 2010 to find a solution  This got a few of the club's investors to stop in the club at the turn of 2009-10. Although they managed to raise money to keep the club going, they failed to get over the economic problems and after the 2010-11 season, many of their big profiles such as Susann Müller, Marta Tomac and Gitte Brøgger Led left the club. The team started the following season on an even smaller budget, but in November 2011, the management decided to take steps against dissolving the club when the then investors didn't want to increase the support. Subsequently a group of investors secured the club's future which resulted in the continuation of the club

In the 2011-12 season, SK Aarhus was relegated after an 8th place in the league and a 3rd place in the qualifying group. In the 2013-14 season, SK Aarhus returned to the league after gaining a 2nd place in the league and winning 2-0 against Nykøbing Falster Håndboldklub. In 2017 it was announced that SK Aarhus would close after the 2016-17 season and that the newly formed Aarhus United would take over their league licence.

Team

Current squad
Squad for the 2016–17 season

Goalkeepers 
 1  Mathilde Juncker
 12  Lærke Sørensen
 16  Anne-Sofie Ernstrøm
Wingers 
LW
 11  Trine Leth
 18  Malene Gandrup
RW
 17  Charlotte Mikkelsen
 19  Anne Tolstrup
Line players
 21  Majbritt Toft Hansen
 29  Camilla Fangel

Back players
LB
 20  Anne Sofie Hjort
 23  Anna Sophie Okkels
CB
 2  Amalie Jacobsen
 7  Emma Mogensen
 15  Julie Pontoppidan
RB
 4  Lærke Christensen
 14  Mette Tranborg

Notable former players

Seasons

Cup Winners Cup

References

External links
The club's homepage 

Danish handball clubs